Forever and a Day is a serial drama, podcast, and audio drama created by Casey S. Hutchison. The podcast follows the lives of three families in the fictional town of Augustus, Illinois.

Series overview

Season 1
The first season focuses on Leslie Marshall's marriage to Alex Bennett after leaving her former high school sweetheart Colin Harper at the altar. Leslie and Alex are raising their son Aiden as Colin finds new love with schemer Emma Jensen, who's secretly working with Alex to bring Colin and the Harpers down. Colin's mother Elaine deals with her sister Melanie Walters coming to town with a huge secret that only Elaine's scheming husband Gunnar knows. And Stephanie Markum comes face-to-face with her stalker who happens to be her ex-boyfriend Donovan Aldridge. Donovan vows to reunite with his "Beautiful Blue" and start anew with her.

Season 2
Season two sees the Harpers and the Bennetts' decades long feud comes closer to a resolution as they family deals with the fallout of Katelynn Harper & Laken Bennett both being outed as lesbians publicly and a couple. Emma begins to actually fall for Colin and discovers she's pregnant. Alex and Leslie's marriage gets rocky; Alex sleeps with Danielle Fraser during his separation from Leslie. A dangerous woman named Dominique Bradford comes to town hell bent on settling a score with Leslie's uncle Gregory. A shocking death rocks Augustus. The season finale ends with Dominique holding everyone hostage at gunpoint, and three people being shot.

Season 3
In season three, the town of Augustus is slowly healing from the aftermath of the shooting. Gossip blogger Danielle Fraser and her brother Jesse Jr. "JJ" deal with a family secret. Donovan adds to his list of people to terrorize. And Gregory's estranged son Dr. Christopher Marshall comes to town with trouble following him.

Cast and characters

Production
For the first three seasons, Forever and a Day was distributed by JLJ Media. Starting with season three, the show moved to Anchor Podcasts.

Reception
On April 7, 2022, the show was nominated and won Best Ensemble for an Audio Fiction at the Indie Series Awards.

References

External links
 

Radio drama
2020 podcast debuts
LGBT-related podcasts
Audio podcasts 
American podcasts